Inanidrilus extremus is a species of annelid worm. It is known from subtidal coarse coral sands in the Atlantic coast of Florida.

References

extremus
Invertebrates of the United States
Fauna of the Atlantic Ocean
Taxa named by Christer Erséus
Animals described in 1979